The Forum 4 Service Delivery (F4SD) is South African political party founded in 2015 to tackle grassroot issues such as water, sanitation, housing, immigration laws, education and children going to school without shoes. The party registered to contest the 2016 South African municipal elections in five provinces: North West, Mpumalanga, Northern Cape, Gauteng and Limpopo.

The party contested the 2016 Local Government elections, winning 31 seats, 29 in the North West Province, and one each in Mpumalanga and the Free State. The party also contested also 2019 general election. failing to win a seat. The party's primary demand in their 2019 manifesto was direct speedy services to the people and the removal of all foreign nationals.

Election results

National elections

|-
! Election
! Total votes
! Share of vote
! Seats 
! +/–
! Government
|-
! 2019
| 8,525
| 0.05%
| 
| –
| 
|}

Provincial elections

! rowspan=2 | Election
! colspan=2 | Eastern Cape
! colspan=2 | Free State
! colspan=2 | Gauteng
! colspan=2 | Kwazulu-Natal
! colspan=2 | Limpopo
! colspan=2 | Mpumalanga
! colspan=2 | North-West
! colspan=2 | Northern Cape
! colspan=2 | Western Cape
|-
! % !! Seats
! % !! Seats
! % !! Seats
! % !! Seats
! % !! Seats
! % !! Seats
! % !! Seats
! % !! Seats
! % !! Seats
|-
! 2019
| 0.05% || 0/63
| - || -
| - || -
| - || -
| - || -
| 0.08% || 0/30
| 0.33% || 0/33
| - || -
| 0.02% || 0/42
|}

Municipal elections 

|-
!Election
!Votes
!%
!Change
|-
!2016
|align="right"|86,667
|align="right"|0.23%
|align="right"|-
|-
! 2021
| 81,960
| 0.27%
| 0.04
|-
|}

In the 2021 election, the party increased its representation from one to two seats in the Ditsobotla Local Municipality. In the 2022 election, held after the entire council was dissolved, it retained its seats.

References

2016 establishments in South Africa
Political parties established in 2016
Political parties in South Africa